Pavlovich is an anglicized form or transliteration of the Slavic surnames Pavlović/Павловић (Serbo-Croatian) and Pavlovič/Павлович/Паўловіч/Павлович (Slovenian/Russian/Belarusian/Bulgarian). Notable people with the surname include:

 Nicolás Pavlovich (born 1978), Argentine footballer
 Parteniy Pavlovich (circa 1695 – 1760), Bulgarian Eastern Orthodox bishop
 Paul Pavlovich (born 1970), American artist
 Veronika Pavlovich (born 1978), Belarusian table tennis player
 Viktoria Pavlovich (born 1978), Belarusian table tennis player
 Vladislav Pavlovich (born 1971), Russian fencer
 Claudia Pavlovich Arellano Former Governor of the Mexican State of Sonora

 Pavlović noble family, served the Kingdom of Bosnia (1391-1463)